PDC World Championship Darts 2009 is a sports video game, published by Oxygen and developed and designed by Rebellion Developments. It was released exclusively on Nintendo platforms for the Nintendo DS and Wii on May 29, 2009. The game features eighteen professionals from the Professional Darts Corporation. The game includes a Create-A-Player mode, which for the first time, players can create a female dart player to use in both Career Mode and Exhibition Mode. There is also a practice mode. It is a direct sequel to the previous year's game, PDC World Championship Darts 2008.  While the game was primarily aimed at PAL regions, the DS version was released in North America as one of four versions of the localization for Darts 2008 on June 16, 2009.

Among the game's roster are three top world dart players at the time: Phil Taylor, Raymond van Barneveld and James Wade.  

2009 video games
Nintendo DS games
Wii games
Professional Darts Corporation
Darts video games
Video games developed in the United Kingdom
Video games featuring protagonists of selectable gender
Rebellion Developments games
Oxygen Games games
Multiplayer and single-player video games